is a Japanese football player for SC Sagamihara.

Club statistics
Updated to 25 February 2019.

References

External links
Profile at Shonan Bellmare

1988 births
Living people
Senshu University alumni
Association football people from Kanagawa Prefecture
Japanese footballers
J1 League players
J2 League players
J3 League players
Shonan Bellmare players
Kashiwa Reysol players
Oita Trinita players
SC Sagamihara players
Association football forwards